The Saskatchewan Rush are a lacrosse team based in Saskatoon, Saskatchewan playing in the National Lacrosse League (NLL). The 2017 season is the 12th in franchise history, 2nd in Saskatchewan. they originally played in Edmonton.

Current standings

Game log

Regular season
Reference:

Playoffs

Player stats

Runners (Top 10)

Note: GP = Games played; G = Goals; A = Assists; Pts = Points; LB = Loose balls; PIM = Penalty minutes

Goaltenders
Note: GP = Games played; MIN = Minutes; W = Wins; L = Losses; GA = Goals against; Sv% = Save percentage; GAA = Goals against average

Entry Draft
The 2016 NLL Entry Draft took place on September 26, 2016. The Rush made the following selections:

See also
2017 NLL season

References

Saskatchewan Rush
Saskatchewan Rush seasons
Saskatchewan Rush